Justin Marshall (born  in Benson, Illinois) is an American wheelchair curler.

He participated in the 2018 Winter Paralympics where American team finished on twelfth place.

Teams

References

External links 

Justin MARSHALL - Athlete Profile - World Para Nordic Skiing - Live results | International Paralympic Committee

 Video: 

Living people
1986 births
People from Woodford County, Illinois
American male curlers
American disabled sportspeople
American wheelchair curlers
Paralympic wheelchair curlers of the United States
Wheelchair curlers at the 2018 Winter Paralympics